Conualevia is a genus of sea slugs, shell-less marine dorid nudibranchs in the family Dorididae.

Species 
The following species are recognised in the genus Conualevia:
 Conualevia alba Collier & Farmer, 1964
 Conualevia marcusi Collier & Farmer, 1964
 Conualevia mizuna Marcus & Marcus, 1967

References

Dorididae